Walter Pite (24 September 1876 – 7 May 1955) was an Australian cricketer. He played two first-class matches for New South Wales between 1901/02 and 1914/15.

See also
 List of New South Wales representative cricketers

References

External links
 

1876 births
1955 deaths
Australian cricketers
New South Wales cricketers
Cricketers from Sydney